Reshma Rathore is an Indian actress and model who appears in South Indian films. Her film career started with Bodyguard (Telugu) in which she played Trisha's friend, thereafter she made her debut with the Ee Rojullo film directed by Maruthi which was screened for 175 days in theatres. She was awarded best confident Face of The Year 2012 for Ee Rojullo and also she was nominated for 2nd South Indian International Movie Awards for best female debutante for the same. There after she did films like Jai Sriram with hero Uday Kiran, Love Cycle,  Jeelakarabellam, Pratighatana with Tammareddy Bharadwaja. In the film, Prathighatana (a socio-political thriller), she plays the role of a rape victim.

Early life and education
Reshma Rathore was born in Yellandhu, Bhadradri Kothagudem district, to Shri Haridas Rathore who is working as a Deputy Superintending Mining Engineer in Singareni Collieries Company, Godavarikhani and late Smt. Radha Bai Rathore, who is a High Court lawyer. She secured an admission at Kakatiya University to pursue a Bachelor of Law degree in Warangal. She has one younger brother, Prithviraj Rathore, who is doing Bachelor of Medicine, Bachelor of Surgery.
She moved to Mumbai in 2016 after her Mother's death who died of Cardiac arrest at the age of 40.Reshma had the toughest time in making important life's decisions and choices.

Career

Reshma Rathore started her film career started with Bodyguard, in which she played Trisha's friend's role, thereafter she made her debut with Ee Rojullo, directed by Maruthi. She got appreciated for her acting by Dasari Narayana Rao. In Jai Sriram platinum disc function Dasari Narayana Rao said "I like Reshma's performance in Ee Rojullo very much, she is very simple girl & will be a very successful in full actress" in Telugu film industry. Ee Rojullo was very successful at box office completing 175 days on 13 September 2012, 365 days on 23 March 2013. She got CineMAA Awards for Ee Rojullo and also was nominated for 2nd South Indian International Movie Awards for best female debutant for Ee Rojullo.

Political career

Reshma took a small break from acting in 2018  and joined into politics. She joined in BJP on April 14 AmbedkarJayanthi and currently working as a youth leader in youth wing (BJYM). In an interview with Times of India she said the reason behind her political 
entry is to establish Bayyaram steel factory which gives self employment for thousands of local youth. “This region is known for its natural resources, but we need to tap them". Reshma with her power-packed speeches, charisma and easy approach left an impression on the voters.

Awards

Filmography

References

External links 

 
 

Actresses from Hyderabad, India
Living people
Actresses in Tamil cinema
Actresses in Telugu cinema
Indian film actresses
21st-century Indian actresses
Year of birth missing (living people)
Actresses in Malayalam cinema